Kenneth Thordal (born 16 October 1965 in Copenhagen) is a Danish musician, songwriter, music producer, composer, writer and translator.

Among other things, Thordal is known for writing the Danish translation of the lyrics and dialogue of the Broadway musical The Book of Mormon for Det Ny Teater, directed by Kasper Holten.

See also
Danish Music Awards
List of Danish composers
Music of Denmark

References

External links
Official website

Danish composers
Male composers
Musicians from Copenhagen
Living people
1965 births
20th-century Danish male musicians